Schauder is a surname. Notable people with the surname include:

 Hans Schauder (1911–2001), British educator
 Juliusz Schauder (1899–1943), Polish mathematician
 Till Schauder (born 1971), German-American filmmaker